Pauw & Witteman was a Dutch late-night talk show, hosted by Jeroen Pauw and Paul Witteman. It was generally focused on current affairs and politics. It was broadcast every weekday at 11 pm on Nederland 1. It was initially co-produced by Dutch public broadcasters NPS and VARA, and subsequently produced solely by VARA.

During summer (in July and August) Pauw & Witteman were replaced by Knevel & Van de Brink, a talk show hosted by Andries Knevel and Tijs van den Brink, produced by the Dutch evangelical broadcasting company EO.

Notable episodes
On January 11, 2008, crime reporter Peter R. de Vries challenged Joran van der Sloot on live television regarding his honesty of his involvement in the disappearance of Natalee Holloway. After the telecast of the show ended, studio and audience cameras recorded Van der Sloot throwing a glass of red wine into De Vries' face.

References

External links

Dutch television talk shows
NPO 1 original programming